Payyanur railway station (Code: PAY) is a railway station serving the town of Payyanur in the Kannur district of Kerala. This is a NSG-4 category railway station. This station is the second largest railway station of Kannur district in terms of area after Kannur railway station.

Line 
It lies in the Shoranur–Mangalore section of the Southern Railways. The station has three platforms and five tracks.

Location 
Payyanur Railway station is located 3.6 km from Payyanur New Bus Stand and 2.7 km from Old Bus Stand, Payyanur, and 4.4 km from KSRTC bus stand, Payyanur (on NH-66).

Kannur International Airport is 60 km from the railway station.

Services 
No trains originate from the station. Trains halting at the station connect the town to prominent cities in India such as Trivandrum Central, Ernakulam Junction, Mumbai, Chennai Central, Bangalore, Kozhikode, Thrissur, Coimbatore Junction, Kollam, Mangalore, Mysore, Pune, Pondicherry, New Delhi and so forth.

Importance 

References

External links

Railway stations in Kannur district
Palakkad railway division